Natalis "Nat" Chan Pak Cheung (born 3 December 1950 in Hong Kong), also known by his nickname "Smart", is a Hong Kong television host, film actor, singer and producer.

Besides his duties as a variety show host, he has also been a horse racing commentator and horse trainer. In total, his horses have won 54 races, including the hard to achieve triple-trifecta six times.

In the recent decade, he invested in Star East with Eric Tsang.

Partial filmography

My Kickass Wife (2019)
Flirting Scholar from the Future (2019)
Super Models (2015)
From Vegas to Macau II (2015)
4 in Life (2013)
I Love Hong Kong 2013 (2013)
I Love Wing Chun (2011)
Adventure of the King (2010)
Flirting Scholar 2 (2010)
72 Tenants of Prosperity (2010)
The Luckiest Man (2008)
Beauty and the 7 Beasts (2007)
Kung Fu Mahjong 3: The Final Duel (2007)
Women on the Run (2005)
Love Is a Many Stupid Thing (2004)
Men Suddenly in Black (2003)
The Conmen in Vegas (1999)
Gigolo of Chinese Hollywood (1999)
Tricky King (1998)
L-O-V-E... Love (1997)
Those Were the Days (1997)
How to Meet the Lucky Stars (1996)
Twinkle Twinkle Lucky Star (Yun cai zhi li xing) (1996)
Dream Lover (1995)
Burger Cop (1995)
The Saint of Gamblers (1995)
Modern Romance (1994)
Perfect Exchange (1993)
Flirting Scholar (1993)
Last Hero in China (1993)
Fight Back to School III (1993)
Future Cops (1993)
The Tigers: The Legend of Canton (1993)
King of Beggars (1992)
Ghost Punting (1992)
Royal Tramp II (1992)
Royal Tramp (1992)
Fist of Fury 1991 II (1992)
The Banquet (1991)
Fist of Fury 1991 (1991)
The Last Blood (1991)
Tricky Brains (1991)
Kung Fu VS Acrobatic (1991)
Little Cop (1989)
Funny Ghost (1989)
Magic Crystal (1986)
I Love Lolanto (1984)
Carry On Pickpocket (1983)
Chor Lau-heung (1979)

References

External links
 

1950 births
Living people
Hong Kong Buddhists
Hong Kong male film actors
Hong Kong film presenters
Hong Kong film producers
Hong Kong television presenters
TVB actors